Mud Lake within the U.S. state of Louisiana may refer to:

 Mud Lake, Calcasieu Parish, Louisiana  
 Mud Lake, Calcasieu Parish, Louisiana  
 Mud Lake, Cameron Parish, Louisiana  
 Mud Lake, Cameron Parish, Louisiana  
 Mud Lake, Concordia Parish, Louisiana  
 Mud Lake, Concordia Parish, Louisiana  
 Mud Lake, Morehouse Parish, Louisiana  
 Mud Lake, St. Mary Parish, Louisiana  
 Mud Lake, St. Mary Parish, Louisiana  
 Mud Lake, Tensas Parish, Louisiana  
 Mud Lake, Tensas Parish, Louisiana  
 Mud Lake, Terrebonne Parish, Louisiana  
 Mud Lake, Vermilion Parish, Louisiana  
 Mud Lake, West Feliciana Parish, Louisiana

References
 USGS-U.S. Board on Geographic Names

Lakes of Louisiana